Urmas Muru (born August 27, 1961, in Pärnu) is an Estonian architect and artist.

From 1968 to 1979 Urmas Muru studied in the 2nd Secondary School of Pärnu (today's Koidula Gymnasium of Pärnu). From 1979 Urmas Muru studied in the State Art Institute of the Estonian SSR (today's Estonian Academy of Arts) in the department of architecture. He graduated from the institute in 1984.

From 1984 to 1985 Urmas Muru worked in the Tallinn office of the Tsentrosojuz design bureau. From 1986 to 1990 he worked in the state design bureau Eesti Tööstusprojekt (Estonian Industrial Design). At present time Urmas Muru works in the Muru&Pere OÜ architectural bureau.

Most notable works by Urmas Muru are the Pääsküla library, the Haabersti recreational center, numerous apartment buildings and single-family homes. His art production consists of paintings and performances. Urmas Muru is a member of the Union of Estonian Architects and the Union of Estonian Artists.

Works
Gulfoil warehouse in Laagri, 2002 (with Peeter Pere)
Social housing in Lasnamäe, 2003 (with Peeter Pere)
Single-family home in Kiili, 2004 (with Peeter Pere)
Single-family home in Tabasalu, 2004 (with Peeter Pere)
Pääsküla library, 2005 (kaasautorid Peeter Pere)
Apartment building in Tartu, 2006 (with Peeter Pere)
Aluminium-house, 2007 (with Peeter Pere)
Haabersti recreational center, 2007 (with Peeter Pere)
Summer kitchen and sauna in Southern Estonia, 2008 (with Peeter Pere, Reet Viigipuu)
Apartment buildings in Tallinn, 2008 (with Peeter Pere, Reet Viigipuu)

See also
 List of Estonian architects

References

Union of Estonian Architects, members
Architectural Bureau Muru&Pere OÜ

Estonian architects
1961 births
Living people
Estonian Academy of Arts alumni
People from Pärnu